James M. Metcalf (May 11, 1920 – March 8, 1977) was a journalist for WWL-TV in New Orleans, Louisiana where he served as anchor/reporter. He later became the host of A Sunday Journal from 1973 until his death from cancer in 1977, which was considered a "class act" in bringing ordinary people and their hobbies and interests to television. In 1975, Jim and his show were awarded the Peabody Award for "good writing, excellent photography, and artistic presentation."

The Jim Metcalf Memorial Award was created in his honor, and is bestowed by the Press Club of New Orleans annually.

He also wrote four volumes of poetry, one published posthumously, being described as "infatuated with words. He loved the language. He used it well."

Works published
Jim Metcalf's Journal (1974) 
In Some Quiet Place (1975) 
Please to Begin (1976) 
Follow Another Star (1979) 
Collected Poems (2000)

References

External links
WWL 50 year anniversary Has clips of Jim Metcalf as a reporter and on A Sunday Journal
The Past Whispers Text of some of his poetry
Jim Metcalf reciting some of his poetry, as featured on his TV program, "A Sunday Journal"

American television journalists
Television anchors from New Orleans
New Orleans television reporters
Peabody Award winners
1920 births
1977 deaths
20th-century American poets
American male journalists
American male poets
20th-century American male writers
20th-century American non-fiction writers
University of North Texas alumni
People from Wichita Falls, Texas
Deaths from cancer in the United States